David Michael Walker (born November 24, 1993) is an American professional basketball player for Monbus Obradoiro of the Spanish Liga ACB.

College career 
A 2012 graduate of Stow-Munroe Falls High School, Walker attended Northeastern University from 2012 to 2016. He finished his four-year Husky career as the school's eighth all-time leading scorer with 1,631 points, fifth all-time assist man (420 assists) and second all-time leader in three-pointers made (250).

Professional career 
He represented the Miami Heat in the 2016 NBA Summer League and signed with MoraBanc Andorra of the Spanish Liga ACB in August 2016. He made 35 ACB appearances as a first-year professional player, averaging 9.0 points as well as 2.6 rebounds and 1.4 assists. Walker led Andorra in made three-pointers (61) over the course of the 2016-17 season.

On July 3, 2018, he re-signed with MoraBanc Andorra.

On July 31, 2020, he has signed with Medi Bayreuth of the Basketball Bundesliga. In Bundesliga play, Walker was 57-133 from three-point range in the 2020-21 season, averaging 8.4 points per game. 

He signed a deal with fellow Bundesliga outfit MHP Riesen Ludwigsburg in August 2021.

On January 17, 2022, he has signed with Bilbao Basket of the Liga ACB.

On August 13, 2022, he has signed with Monbus Obradoiro of the Spanish Liga ACB.

References

External links 
 ACB profile 
 Northeastern Huskies bio

1993 births
Living people
American expatriate basketball people in Spain
American men's basketball players
Basketball players from Ohio
BC Andorra players
Expatriate basketball people in Andorra
American expatriate basketball people in Andorra
Liga ACB players
Northeastern Huskies men's basketball players
Obradoiro CAB players
People from Stow, Ohio
Riesen Ludwigsburg players
Small forwards